Hélène Cixous (born 5 June 1937) is a French writer, playwright and literary critic. She is known for her experimental writing style and great versatility as a writer and thinker, her work dealing with multiple genres: theater, literary and feminist theory, art criticism, autobiography and poetic fiction. Since 1967, she has published a considerable body of work consisting of some seventy titles, mainly published in the original French by Grasset, Gallimard, Des femmes and Galilée. 

Cixous is perhaps best known for her 1976 article "The Laugh of the Medusa", which established her as one of the early thinkers in post-structural feminism. Her plays have been directed by Simone Benmussa at the Théâtre d'Orsay, by Daniel Mesguich at the Théâtre de la Ville and by Ariane Mnouchkine at the Théâtre du Soleil. During her academic career she was primarily associated with the Centre universitaire de Vincennes (today's University of Paris VIII), where she founded the first centre of women's studies at a European university.

Life and career

Personal life 
Cixous was born in Oran, French Algeria, to Jewish parents, Eve Cixous, née Klein, (1910–2013) and Georges Cixous (1909–1948). Georges Cixous, a physician who had written his dissertation on tuberculosis, died of the disease in 1948. Eve Cixous became a midwife in Algiers following his death, "until her expulsion with the last French doctors and midwives in 1971." Cixous' brother, Pierre, "a medical student and a supporter of Algerian independence" was condemned to death in 1961 by the Organisation Armée Secrète, and joined Cixous in Bordeaux. Her mother and brother returned to Algeria following the country's independence in 1962. They were arrested, and Cixous "obtained their release with the help of Ahmed Ben Bella's lawyer."

Cixous married Guy Berger in 1955, with whom she had three children, Anne-Emmanuelle (b. 1958), Stéphane (1960–1961), and Pierre-François (b. 1961). Cixous and Berger divorced in 1964.

Academic career 
Cixous earned her agrégation in English in 1959 and her Doctorat ès lettres in 1968. Her main focus, at this time, was English literature and the works of James Joyce. Cixous became assistante at the University of Bordeaux in 1962, served as maître assistante at the Sorbonne from 1965 to 1967, and was appointed maître de conférence at Paris Nanterre University in 1967.

In 1968, following the French student riots, Cixous was charged with founding the University of Paris VIII, "created to serve as an alternative to the traditional French academic environment." Cixous would, in 1974, found the University's center for women's studies, the first in Europe. Cixous is a professor at the University of Paris VIII and at the European Graduate School in Saas-Fee, Switzerland.

Publications 
In 1968, Cixous published her doctoral dissertation L'Exil de James Joyce ou l'Art du remplacement (The Exile of James Joyce, or the Art of Displacement) and the following year she published her first novel, Dedans (Inside), a semi-autobiographical work that won the Prix Médicis.

She has published widely, including twenty-three volumes of poems, six books of essays, five plays, and numerous influential articles. She published Voiles (Veils) with Jacques Derrida and her work is often considered deconstructive. In introducing her Wellek Lecture, subsequently published as Three Steps on the Ladder of Writing, Derrida referred to her as the greatest living writer in his language (French). Cixous wrote a book on Derrida titled Portrait de Jacques Derrida en jeune saint juif (Portrait of Jacques Derrida as a Young Jewish Saint). Her reading of Derrida finds additional layers of meaning at a phonemic rather than strictly lexical level. In addition to Derrida and Joyce, she has written monographs on the work of the Brazilian writer Clarice Lispector, on Maurice Blanchot, Franz Kafka, Heinrich von Kleist, Michel de Montaigne, Ingeborg Bachmann, Thomas Bernhard, and the Russian poet Marina Tsvetaeva. Cixous is also the author of essays on artists, including Simon Hantaï, Pierre Alechinsky and Adel Abdessemed to whom she has devoted two books.

Along with Luce Irigaray and Julia Kristeva, Cixous is considered one of the mothers of poststructuralist feminist theory.
In the 1970s, Cixous began writing about the relationship between sexuality and language. Like other poststructuralist feminist theorists, Cixous believes that our sexuality is directly tied to how we communicate in society. In 1975, Cixous published her most influential article "Le rire de la méduse" ("The Laugh of the Medusa"), which was revised by her, translated into English by Paula Cohen and Keith Cohen, and released in English in 1976. She has published over 70 works; her fiction, dramatic writing, and poetry, however, are not often read in English.

The Bibliothèque nationale de France
In 2000, a collection in Cixous' name was created at the Bibliothèque nationale de France after Cixous donated the entirety of her manuscripts to date. They then featured in the exhibit "Brouillons d'écrivains" held there in 2001.

In 2003, the Bibliothèque held the conference "Genèses Généalogies Genres: Autour de l'oeuvre d'Hélène Cixous". Among the speakers were Mireille Calle-Gruber, Marie Odile Germain, Jacques Derrida, Annie Leclerc, Ariane Mnouchkine, Ginette Michaud, and Cixous herself.

Film 
Hélène Cixous is featured in Olivier Morel's 118-minute film Ever, Rêve, Hélène Cixous (France, USA, 2018).

Accolades and awards
Cixous holds honorary degrees from Queen's University and the University of Alberta in Canada; University College Dublin in Ireland; the University of York and University College London in the UK; and Georgetown University, Northwestern University, and the University of Wisconsin–Madison in the USA. In 2008 she was appointed as A.D. White Professor-at-Large at Cornell University until June 2014.

Influences on Cixous' writing
Some of the most notable influences on her writings have been Jacques Derrida, Sigmund Freud, Jacques Lacan and Arthur Rimbaud.

Sigmund Freud
Psychoanalyst Sigmund Freud established the initial theories that would serve as a basis for some of Cixous' arguments in developmental psychology. Freud's analysis of gender roles and sexual identity concluded with separate paths for boys and girls through the Oedipus complex, theories of which Cixous was particularly critical.

Jacques Derrida
Contemporaries, lifelong friends, and intellectuals, Jacques Derrida and Cixous both grew up as French Jews in Algeria and share a "belonging constituted of exclusion and nonbelonging"—not Algerian, rejected by France, their Jewishness concealed or acculturated. In Derrida's family "one never said 'circumcision' but 'baptism,' not 'Bar Mitzvah' but 'communion.'" Judaism cloaked in Catholicism is one example of the undecidability of identity that influenced the thinker whom Cixous calls a "Jewish Saint". Her book Portrait of Jacques Derrida as a Young Jewish Saint addresses these matters.

Through deconstruction, Derrida employed the term logocentrism (which was not his coinage). This is the concept that explains how language relies on a hierarchical system that values the spoken word over the written word in Western culture. The idea of binary opposition is essential to Cixous' position on language. 

Cixous and Luce Irigaray combined Derrida's logocentric idea and Lacan's symbol for desire, creating the term phallogocentrism. This term focuses on Derrida's social structure of speech and binary opposition as the center of reference for language, with the phallic being privileged and how women are only defined by what they lack; not A vs. B, but, rather A vs. ¬A (not-A).

In a dialogue between Derrida and Cixous, Derrida said about Cixous: "Helene's texts are translated across the world, but they remain untranslatable. We are two French writers who cultivate a strange relationship, or a strangely familiar relationship with the French language – at once more translated and more untranslatable than many a French author. We are more rooted in the French language than those with ancestral roots in this culture and this land."

Major works

The Laugh of the Medusa (1975)

Cixous' critical feminist essay "The Laugh of the Medusa", originally written in French as Le Rire de la Méduse in 1975, was (after she revised it) translated into English by Paula Cohen and Keith Cohen in 1976. It has become a seminal essay, particularly because it announces what Cixous called écriture féminine, a distinctive mode of writing for women and by women.

Bibliography

Published in English

Selected books
 
 
 
 
 
 
 
 
 
 
 
 
 
 
 
 
 
  co-authored with Jacques Derrida.
 
 
 
  Foreword by Jacques Derrida.
 
 
 
 
 
 
 
 
 
 
 
 
 
 Well-Kept Ruins. Translation by Beverley Bie Brahic, Seagull Books, 2022 ISBN 9781 80309 059 7

Plays
 "The Conquest of the School at Madhubai," trans. Carpenter, Deborah. 1986.
 "The Name of Oedipus," trans. Christiane Makward & Miller, Judith. In: Out of Bounds: Women's Theatre in French. Ann Arbor: University of Michigan Press.  1992.
 "The Terrible but Unfinished Story of Norodom Sihanouk, King of Cambodia," trans. Juliet Flower MacCannell, Judith Pike, and Lollie Groth. University of Nebraska Press, 1994.

Published in French

Criticism
 L'Exil de James Joyce ou l'Art du remplacement (The Exile of James Joyce, or the Art of Displacement). 1969 (1985).

Books
 
 
 
 
 
 
 
 
 
 
 
 
 
 
 
 
 
 
 
 .
 
 
 
 
 
 
 
 
 
 
 
 
 
 
 
 
 
 
 
 
 
 
 
 
 Ruines bien rangées published by Éditions Gallimard, 2020

Theater
 La Pupulle, Cahiers Renaud-Barrault, Gallimard, 1971.
 Portrait de Dora, Des femmes, 1976.
 Le Nom d'Oedipe. Chant du corps interdit, Des femmes, 1978.
 La Prise de l'école de Madhubaï, Avant-scène du Théâtre, 1984.
 L'Histoire terrible mais inachevée de Norodom Sihanouk, roi du Cambodge, Théâtre du Soleil, 1985.
 Théâtre, Des femmes, 1986.
 L'Indiade, ou l'Inde de leurs rêves, Théâtre du Soleil, 1987.
 On ne part pas, on ne revient pas, Des femmes, 1991.
 Les Euménides d'Eschyle (traduction), Théâtre du Soleil, 1992.
 L'Histoire (qu'on ne connaîtra jamais), Des femmes, 1994.
 "Voile Noire Voile Blanche / Black Sail White Sail", bilingual, trad. Catherine A.F. MacGillivray, New Literary History 25, 2 (Spring), Minnesota University Press, 1994.
 La Ville parjure ou le Réveil des Érinyes, Théâtre du Soleil, 1994.
 Jokasta, libretto to the opera of Ruth Schönthal, 1997.
 Tambours sur la digue, Théâtre du Soleil, 1999.
 Rouen, la Trentième Nuit de Mai '31, Galilée, 2001.
 Le Dernier Caravansérail, Théâtre du Soleil, 2003.
 Les Naufragés du Fol Espoir, Théâtre du Soleil, 2010.

Selected essays
 L'Exil de James Joyce ou l'Art du remplacement (doctoral thesis), Grasset, 1969.
 Prénoms de personne, Le Seuil, 1974.
 The Exile of James Joyce or the Art of Replacement (translation by Sally Purcell of L'exil de James Joyce ou l'Art du remplacement). New York: David Lewis, 1980.
 Un K. Incompréhensible : Pierre Goldman, Christian Bourgois, 1975.
 La Jeune Née, with Catherine Clément, 10/18, 1975.
 La Venue à l'écriture, with Madeleine Gagnon and Annie Leclerc, 10/18, 1977.
 Entre l'écriture, Des femmes, 1986.
 L'Heure de Clarice Lispector, Des femmes, 1989.
 Photos de racines, with Mireille Calle-Gruber, Des femmes, 1994.
 Lettre à Zohra Drif, 1998
 Portrait de Jacques Derrida en Jeune Saint Juif, Galilée, 2001.
 Rencontre terrestre, with Frédéric-Yves Jeannet, Galilée, 2005.
 Le Tablier de Simon Hantaï, 2005.
 Insister. À Jacques Derrida, Galilée, 2006.
 Le Voisin de zéro : Sam Beckett, Galilée, 2007
 Défions l'augure (on the quote 'we defy augury' from Hamlet), Galilée, 2018

See also
 Antinarcissism
 List of deconstructionists
 Jean-Louis de Rambures, "Comment travaillent les écrivains", Paris 1978 (interview with H. Cixous)
 Phallic monism

References

Further reading

External links
 "The Laugh of the Medusa", by Hélène Cixous, translated into English by Keith Cohen and Paula Cohen
  approach the notion of affinity through a discussion of "Disruptive Kinship," co-sponsored by Villa Gillet and the School of Writing at The New School for Public Engagement.
 Julie Jaskin: An introduction to Cixous
 Mary Jane Parrine: Stanford Presidential Lectures' Cixous page
 Carola Hilfrich: Hélène Cixous Biography at Jewish Women: A Comprehensive Historical Encyclopedia
 Stanford Presidential Lectures and Symposia in the Humanities and Arts

1937 births
20th-century Algerian poets
20th-century Algerian women writers
20th-century essayists
20th-century French dramatists and playwrights
20th-century French Jews
20th-century French novelists
20th-century French philosophers
20th-century French poets
20th-century French women writers
21st-century essayists
21st-century French dramatists and playwrights
21st-century French Jews
21st-century French novelists
21st-century French philosophers
21st-century French poets
21st-century French women writers
Algerian dramatists and playwrights
Commandeurs of the Ordre des Arts et des Lettres
Continental philosophers
Cornell University faculty
Critical theorists
Deconstruction
Academic staff of European Graduate School
Feminism in France
Feminist studies scholars
Feminist theorists
French essayists
French feminists
French literary critics
French women critics
French literary theorists
French women dramatists and playwrights
French women novelists
French women philosophers
Jewish feminists
Jewish philosophers
Jewish women writers
Literacy and society theorists
Living people
People from Oran
Philosophers of culture
Philosophers of education
Philosophers of history
Philosophers of literature
Philosophers of love
Philosophers of psychology
Philosophers of sexuality
Philosophers of social science
Philosophy academics
Philosophy writers
Postmodern feminists
Poststructuralists
Prix Médicis winners
Rhetoric theorists
Rhetoricians
Social philosophers
Theorists on Western civilization
Academic staff of Paris 8 University Vincennes-Saint-Denis
Academic staff of the University of Paris
Women literary critics
Writers about activism and social change